A.N.T. Farm is the soundtrack album for the Disney Channel television series A.N.T. Farm. It was released on October 11, 2011 by Walt Disney Records. Most of the soundtrack features songs performed in the first season of the series by the lead actress China Anne McClain, as well as new songs performed by cast members Carlon Jeffery and Stefanie Scott, and China Anne and her two sisters, known as the McClain Sisters. The soundtrack was successful, spending five weeks on the Billboard kids chart in 2011. It sold 14,000 copies within the first week of release.

Overview
Most of the songs on the soundtrack are performed by the show's lead actress, China Anne McClain, including the show's theme song, "Exceptional," and covers of Taio Cruz's "Dynamite" and Christina Aguilera's "Beautiful". "Dynamite" and McClain's original song, "Calling All the Monsters," were released as singles from the soundtrack. "Calling All the Monsters" was the first single to chart, peaking at number 86 on America and charting in two more countries.

There are also two songs by cast member Carlon Jeffery: a kid-friendly cover of DJ Jazzy Jeff & The Fresh Prince's "Summertime" and an original song, "Pose," with fellow cast member Stefanie Scott. There are two songs performed by McClain and her sisters Lauryn and Sierra, together known as the McClain Sisters. All of the songs by McClain are solely featured in the first season of the series whereas the other songs did were not featured in the series.

Critical reception

James Christopher Monger of Allmusic gave the album three out of five stars, referring to the theme song as "catchy".

Commercial performance
The soundtrack peaked at number 29 on the US Billboard 200. It has also peaked at number 2 on the US Top Soundtracks and topped the US Kid Albums chart.

Other uses
So far, two songs from the soundtrack have been used in other Disney Channel works besides A.N.T. Farm: "Calling All the Monsters" was used in "Beam It Up", a season 2 Halloween episode of the series Shake It Up. "Pose" by Stefanie Scott and Carlon Jeffery was featured in the Disney Channel Original Movie Frenemies (2012), which Scott starred in.

Track listing

Personnel
Credits for A.N.T. Farm adapted from Allmusic

1984- mixing, producer
Ali Dee- mixing, producer
Johan Alkenäs- composer, producer
Robert Bell- composer
Ronald Bell- composer
George Brown- composer
Taio Cruz- composer
Kara DioGuardi- composer
John Fields- mixing, producer
Toby Gad- composer, mixing, producer
Steve Gerdes- art direction
Lukasz Gottwald- composer
Paul David Hager- mixing
Wes Jones- composer
Spencer Lee- composer
Benjamin Levin- composer
Jon Lind- A&R
Lamar Mahone- composer
Stephen Marcussen- mastering
Dani Markman- A&R
Max Martin- composer
Charlie Mason- composer
China McClain- composer
Lauryn McClain -composer, guitar
Michael McClain- composer, producer, programming
Sierra McClain- composer, guitar

Bonnie McKee- composer
Robert "Spike" Mickens- composer
Niclas Molinder- composer, producer
Dave Pensado- mixing
Linda Perry- composer
Joacim Persson- composer, producer
Lindy Robbins- composer
JD Salbego- additional production
Mathew Sherman- composer
Craig Simpkins- composer
Claydes Smith- composer
Michael "Smidi" Smith- mixing, producer
Michael Dennis Smith- composer
Will Smith- composer
Steve Sterling- design
Alton Taylor- composer
Louie Teran- mastering
Cory Thomas- composer
Dennis Thomas- composer
Steven Vincent- executive in charge of music, soundtrack executive
Windy Wagner- composer
Richard Westfield- composer

Charts

References

2011 soundtrack albums
Television soundtracks
Walt Disney Records soundtracks
Pop soundtracks